The Croatian National Tourist Board ( or HTZ) is Croatia's national tourist organization founded with a view to promoting and creating the identity, and to enhance the reputation of, Croatian tourism. The mission also includes the planning and implementation of a common strategy and the conception of its promotion, proposal and the performance of promotional activities of mutual interest for all subjects in tourism in the country and abroad, as well as raising the overall quality of the whole range of tourist services on offer in the Republic of Croatia. Its headquarters is located in Zagreb.

References

External links
 

Government agencies established in 1992
Government agencies of Croatia
Tourism agencies
Tourism in Croatia
1992 establishments in Croatia
Business organizations based in Croatia